Of Paradise and Power: America and Europe in the New World Order is an essay by Robert Kagan which attempts to explicate the differing approaches that the United States and the nations of Europe take towards the conduct of foreign policy. Kagan argues that the two have different philosophical outlooks on the use of power, which are the natural consequence of the United States' possession of power and the Europeans' lack of it.

Initially published in Policy Review magazine, the essay was widely read and the subject of extensive debate and commentary in both America and Europe. In terms of its impact, it was compared by reviewers to Francis Fukuyama's The End of History and the Last Man, Samuel P. Huntington's The Clash of Civilizations, and even George Kennan's X Article.

Of Paradise and Power was a bestseller in multiple countries. It was a New York Times bestseller for ten weeks. It was also a bestseller in the United Kingdom, France, Germany, Spain, Italy, the Netherlands, and Canada. It has been translated into more than 25 languages.

Notes

Further reading
G. John Ikenberry, Reviewed work(s): Of Paradise and Power: America and Europe in the New World Order by Robert Kagan, Foreign Affairs, Vol. 82, No. 2 (Mar. - Apr., 2003), pp. 145–146

External links
Booknotes interview with Kagan on Of Paradise and Power, February 16, 2003.
 Power and Weakness by Robert Kagan
 Of Paradise and Power by Robert Kagan
 Are Americans Really from Mars, and Europeans From Venus? by Anthony Dworkin
 Paradox and power: the philosopher of a world in turmoil by Paul Vallely
 The Ironies of American Power by Paul O. Carrese
 A Bear Armed with a Gun by David Runciman
 Of Paradise and Power by Howard Zinn
 Americans are from Mars, Europeans are from Venus by Leigh Turner
 Lunch with the FT: Robert Kagan

2003 non-fiction books
American non-fiction books
Books about foreign relations of the United States
Books about international relations